"Cenere" is a song by Italian singer Lazza. It was written by Lazza, Davide Petrella and Dardust, and produced by the latter.

It was released by Island Records on 9 February 2023 as the first single from the re-iussue of Lazza's third album Sirio. The song was the artist's entry for the Sanremo Music Festival 2023, the 73rd edition of Italy's musical festival which doubles also as a selection of the act for the Eurovision Song Contest. He ended up at second place, behind Marco Mengoni.

Music video
The music video for the song was directed by Davide Vicari and released on YouTube on the same day of the single's release.

Charts

References

2023 singles
2023 songs
Sanremo Music Festival songs
Songs written by Davide Petrella
Songs written by Dario Faini